Secrets of the French Police is a 1932 American Pre-Code crime film directed by A. Edward Sutherland and starring Gwili Andre, Gregory Ratoff, and Frank Morgan.

The film was made as a B film by RKO Radio Pictures, using some of the sets from RKO's The Most Dangerous Game (1932). The film is based partly on Samuel Ornitz's own unpublished novel The Last Empress.

Plot
In Paris, a French thief is employed by the Sûreté to investigate a sinister Russian émigré who may have the Grand Duchess Anastasia Nikolaevna of Russia at his house.

Cast
 Gwili Andre as Eugenie Dorain  
 Gregory Ratoff as Han Moloff  
 Frank Morgan as François St. Cyr  
 John Warburton as Leon Renault 
 Rochelle Hudson as K-31 
 Christian Rub as Anton Dorain  
 Murray Kinnell as Bertillon  
 Arnold Korff as Grand Duke Maxim  
 Kendall Lee as Rena Harka  
 Lucien Prival as Lomzoi 
 Guido Trento as Count de Marsay  
 Wong Chung as Chinese Guard
 Harry Cording as Man Reading Newspaper 
 Chester Gan as Chinese Guard  
 Julia Swayne Gordon as Mme. Danton  
 Kate Drain Lawson as Concierge 
 Vivien Oakland as 2nd Cohort of Moloff  
 Cyril Ring in undetermined minor role 
 Ellinor Vanderveer as 1st Cohort of Moloff

References

Bibliography
 Bernard F. Dick, Radical Innocence: A Critical Study of the Hollywood Ten (University Press of Kentucky, 1988)

External links

1932 films
American crime films
American black-and-white films
1932 crime films
Films scored by Max Steiner
Films directed by A. Edward Sutherland
RKO Pictures films
Films set in Paris
1930s English-language films
1930s American films